Gemmula championi is a species of sea snail, a marine gastropod mollusk in the family Turridae, the turrids.

Distribution
This marine species occurs off Tugela Bank, east of Durban, Rep. South Africa

References

External links
  Tucker, J.K. 2004 Catalog of recent and fossil turrids (Mollusca: Gastropoda). Zootaxa 682:1-1295.
 Biolib.cz: Gemmula championi

Endemic fauna of South Africa
championi
Gastropods described in 1983